Nolckenia is a monotypic moth genus of the family Crambidae described by Pieter Cornelius Tobias Snellen in 1875. It contains only one species, Nolckenia margaritalis, described in the same paper, which is found in Colombia.

References

Spilomelinae
Crambidae genera